The Naismith College Defensive Player of the Year Award is an annual basketball award given to the most outstanding defensive player in men's and women's college basketball. It has been awarded by the Atlanta Tipoff Club since 2018. It is named in honor of James Naismith, who invented the game of basketball.

Winners

References

External links

Awards established in 2018
College basketball trophies and awards in the United States
2018 establishments in the United States